Ponce Cement, Inc. was a cement and limestone manufacturer in Ponce, Puerto Rico. The company was located at the intersection of PR-123 and PR-500, in Barrio Magueyes.  It was founded in 1941 by Antonio Ferré Bacallao, a Puerto Rican industrialist of Cuban origin. In 1963, the company became the first Puerto Rican company to go public and be listed in the New York Stock Exchange.

Ponce Cement was part of the Empresas Ferré enterprise from 1941 to 2002. In 1950, Empresas Ferré purchased another cement enterprise, the Puerto Rico Cement Company, then owned by the Government of Puerto Rico. In 2002, Ponce Cement, Inc., was sold to Cemex, a Mexican business concern that is both the world's largest building materials supplier and the third largest cement producer, of which Ponce Cement is now a subsidiary. The plant continues to operate at the same location, and continues to sell its products to the Puerto Rico market, but with the change in ownership, the company is no longer named Ponce Cement, Inc.; it is now Cemex, Puerto Rico. The new owners did keep the Cemento Ponce product label.

History

The municipality of Ponce was the perfect place to establish a cement plant, as the type of soil needed for cement production is abundant in the region. After founding the Puerto Rico Iron Works, and the El Dia newspaper, Empresas Ferré entered the construction business with Ponce Cement, Inc., and subsequently with Puerto Rican Cement, Inc.

Over the 1940s, the company enlarged and Luis A. Ferré became its chief engineer.  By 1960, the company had become the leading cement supplier on the island, much of it the result of increasing new highway and housing construction projects spreading throughout the Island.

Approvals
On 23 February 1989 the Ponce Cement plant received approval for conversion from a wet to a dry manufacturing process, which allowed it to almost double its output. As of year 2000, cement was Puerto Rico's leading nonfuel mineral
commodity.

See also

 Ponce Limestone
 Luis A. Ferré
 Ponce, Puerto Rico

References

Further reading
 Fay Fowlie de Flores. Ponce, Perla del Sur: Una Bibliografía Anotada. Second Edition. 1997. Ponce, Puerto Rico: Universidad de Puerto Rico en Ponce. p. 66. Item 337. 
 "Expansion y Modernización de la Puerto Rican Cement Company, Inc." Urbe. Volume/Year 25 (Octubre-Noviembre 1967) pp. 28-31. (University of Puerto Rico, School of Architecture Library).
 Fay Fowlie de Flores. Ponce, Perla del Sur: Una Bibliografía Anotada. Second Edition. 1997. Ponce, Puerto Rico: Universidad de Puerto Rico en Ponce. p. 63. Item 321. 
 "Cemento...bombones...pañolones de seda." Fomento de Puerto Rico. Volume/Year 1 (January 1952) pp. 20-24. (CUTPO; UPR).
 Fay Fowlie de Flores. Ponce, Perla del Sur: Una Bibliografía Anotada. Second Edition. 1997. Ponce, Puerto Rico: Universidad de Puerto Rico en Ponce. p. 70. Item 372. 
 "Puerto Rican Cement: cuatro décadas de aportaciones." Comercio y Producción. Volume/Year 20 (July-August 1980) p. 22. (Colegio Universitario de Cayey; Recinto Universitario de Mayaguez).
 Fay Fowlie de Flores. Ponce, Perla del Sur: Una Bibliografía Anotada. Second Edition. 1997. Ponce, Puerto Rico: Universidad de Puerto Rico en Ponce. p. 82. Item 438. 
 Luis A. Ferre. "El cemento." Puerto Rico. pp. 335-342. Barranquilla, Colombia: s.n., 1949. (Colección America, vol 10.) (CUTPO).

External links
 Geologic map of the Ponce Quadrangle. R.D. Krushensky and W.H. Monroe. IMAP 863. U.S. Department of The Interior. United States Geological Survey. 1971. Accessed 6 December 2018.

Companies based in Ponce, Puerto Rico
Cement companies of Puerto Rico
1941 establishments in Puerto Rico
Barrio Magueyes Urbano
Limestone industry
Manufacturing companies established in 1941
2002 mergers and acquisitions